Kevin Itabel (born 20 August 1993) is an Argentine footballer who plays as a midfielder for Italian side Gallipoli.

References

1993 births
Living people
Argentine footballers
Argentine expatriate footballers
Association football midfielders
Footballers from Buenos Aires
Argentine Primera División players
Primera Nacional players
Club Atlético Tigre footballers
Atlético de Rafaela footballers
Ferro Carril Oeste footballers
Panetolikos F.C. players
A.S.D. Gallipoli Football 1909 players
Argentine expatriate sportspeople in Greece
Argentine expatriate sportspeople in Italy
Expatriate footballers in Greece
Expatriate footballers in Italy